Chionodes pinax is a moth in the family Gelechiidae. It is found in North America, where it has been recorded from southern British Columbia, Montana and Arizona.

The larvae feed on Pinus contorta and the male flowers of Pinus ponderosa.

References

Chionodes
Moths described in 1999
Moths of North America